Tan Sixin (Chinese: 谭思欣, pinyin: Tán Sì Xīn, born January 10, 1995, in Jiangmen, Guangdong) is a female Chinese gymnast. 
  She joined the Chinese national team in 2009. At age 14, she won the beam final in the 2009 National Games of China beating Olympians including World Champion Deng Linlin. At the Youth Olympics in 2010, she won Gold in the Beam and Floor Exercise and Silver in the All-Around and Uneven Bars final (after Viktoria Komova. She is a balance beam specialist, scoring as high as 15.550.

Tan became a senior in 2011. She won silver on floor at the Cottbus World Cup and gold on beam and bars at the Doha World Cup. At the 2011 Chinese National Championships she won gold with her represented team Shanghai and gold in the all around.
She was named to the team for the 2011 World Artistic Gymnastics Championships held in October 2011 in Tokyo, Japan and won a bronze medal in the team final. However, multiple mistakes in the preliminary competition prevented her from entering the all-around and event finals.

Tan was an alternate for the 2012 Olympic team. She competed at the Individual National Championships finishing out of the medals in the uneven bars and balance beam, which many people consider her best events.

References

External links
 
 

1995 births
Living people
Chinese female artistic gymnasts
Gymnasts at the 2010 Summer Youth Olympics
Gymnasts from Guangdong
People from Jiangmen
Medalists at the World Artistic Gymnastics Championships
Youth Olympic gold medalists for China
21st-century Chinese women